Eraldo Bocci (born 24 August 1942) is an Italian racing cyclist. He rode in the 1970 Tour de France.

References

External links
 

1942 births
Living people
Italian male cyclists
Place of birth missing (living people)
Sportspeople from the Province of Viterbo
Cyclists from Lazio